John Foster Loyer (born December 29, 1964) is an American basketball coach.

Loyer graduated from Northmor High School in Galion, Ohio in 1983. Loyer was the leading scorer for Northmor as a senior. He played college basketball at the University of Akron from 1983 to 1987 and graduated from Akron in 1988 with a degree in social studies. In 1987, he began his career as assistant coach at Akron under Bob Huggins. In 1989, Loyer followed Huggins to the University of Cincinnati and served as assistant coach until 1999. Loyer got his first head coaching job at Wabash Valley College in 1999 and coached there for one season.

In 2000, Loyer became video coordinator for the NBA's Portland Trail Blazers. From 2001 to 2003, Loyer was an advance scout for the Blazers, then was an assistant coach from 2003 to 2005 under Maurice Cheeks. Loyer then followed Cheeks to the Philadelphia 76ers and was an assistant coach from 2005 to 2009. After Cheeks was fired during the  season, Loyer stayed on the staff of interim head coach Tony DiLeo.

In 2009, Loyer joined the staff of New Jersey Nets head coach Lawrence Frank and remained assistant coach to the team until 2011. Loyer served under Avery Johnson in the  season.

Loyer became an assistant coach for the Detroit Pistons in 2011 and again served on the staff of Lawrence Frank. He became reunited with Maurice Cheeks after Cheeks became head coach in 2013.

On February 9, 2014, after the Pistons fired head coach Maurice Cheeks, Loyer was named interim head coach.

Loyer later became a scout for the Los Angeles Clippers.

He is the father of 2018 Mr. Basketball of Michigan winner Foster Loyer and 2022 Indiana Mr. Basketball runner-up Fletcher Loyer.

Head coaching record

|-
| style="text-align:left;"|Detroit
| style="text-align:left;"|
|32||8||24|||| align="center"|4th in Central|||—||—||—||—
| style="text-align:center;"|Missed Playoffs
|- class="sortbottom"
| style="text-align:left;"|Career
| ||32||8||24|||| ||||||||||

References

1964 births
Living people
Akron Zips men's basketball coaches
Akron Zips men's basketball players
American men's basketball coaches
American men's basketball players
Basketball coaches from Ohio
Basketball players from Ohio
Cincinnati Bearcats men's basketball coaches
Detroit Pistons assistant coaches
Detroit Pistons head coaches
New Jersey Nets assistant coaches
People from Clarkston, Michigan
People from Galion, Ohio
Philadelphia 76ers assistant coaches
Portland Trail Blazers assistant coaches
Wabash Valley Warriors men's basketball coaches